Nipper Pat Daly, real name Patrick Clifford Daley (17 February 1913 – 25 September 1988), was a British boxer who fought professionally between 1923 and 1931. He made his professional debut at the age of nine or 10, achieved widespread fame in his mid teens as British boxing's 'Wonderboy', then retired from pro boxing at age 17.

Renowned sportswriter Frank Butler heralded Daly 'the best young prospect we ever had'. He is probably the youngest boxer ever to make The Ring magazine's top-ten world ratings, and it is thought that he is also the youngest-ever professional boxer.

Early life

Born in Abercrave, Wales, he moved to Marylebone, London at the age of five, then moved again with his family to the Canadian mining town of Wayne, Alberta in 1920. Within two years the family returned to Marylebone, and shortly afterwards he started to take boxing lessons at the Marylebone Road gym of 'Professor' Andrew Newton, one of Britain's leading trainers of the day, who coached and managed Daly for most of his career.

Professional career

Early pro debut

Daly's natural aptitude for the sport, combined with Professor Newton's coaching, saw his boxing skill develop at an astonishing rate; so much so that he was entered into his first professional fight at the age of just nine or 10. During the next few years he amassed a long string of victories, fighting at small venues in and around London, often conceding age, height and weight to opponents.

In June 1927, though aged only 14, Daly served as a sparring partner to the reigning world middleweight champion Mickey Walker, who was in London preparing for a world-title defence against Scotland's Tommy Milligan. Walker and his manager, Jack 'Doc' Kearns, were said to be astounded by the young boxer's talent.

Daly fought his first 15-round contest in October 1927 (still aged just 14), and boxed often over that distance throughout the remainder of his career. By the end of 1927, Britain's boxing trade paper Boxing (forerunner to Boxing News) was tipping him as a likely future world champion.

Top flyweight contender at age 15

During 1928 he fought 25 times, defeating many of Britain's leading flyweights, plus the reigning flyweight champion of Italy, Giovanni Sili. A points win over top British flyweight title contender (and future British flyweight champion) Bert Kirby, put Daly in line for a shot at the title, then held by Leith's Johnny Hill. But by late 1928 Daly had outgrown the flyweight class and did not get a title shot. By early 1929 he had moved up to bantamweight.

World ranked at age 16

1929 proved to be Daly's busiest year as a boxer: he had 33 contests, of which he won 29, lost 3 (all inside the distance) and drew 1. Among his fights were victories over some of Europe's best bantamweight and featherweight boxers, including the reigning Belgian bantamweight champion (and future European bantamweight champion) Petit Biquet, recently dethroned British bantamweight champion Alf "Kid" Pattenden, future British bantamweight champion Dick Corbett, former Olympian and ABA bantamweight champion Jack Garland, and German flyweight and bantamweight champion Karl Schulze. There were widespread calls within the press for Daly to be allowed to fight for the British bantamweight title, then held by Teddy Baldock, but a recently introduced BBB of C regulation (later altered) prevented boxers aged under 21 from contesting British titles.

In its September 1929 issue, The Ring magazine ranked Nipper Pat Daly at number 10 in the world at bantamweight (ratings for the month of July) – he was then aged just 16. Shortly afterwards, the veteran boxing impresario Tom O'Rourke offered to bring him to the USA for a series of fights, with the aim of entering him in a world title fight against the newly crowned world featherweight champion Battling Battalino. But Daly's manager, who had signed him under a strict contract, refused to let him go to the States.

On 9 October 1929, he fought the reigning British featherweight champion, Johnny Cuthbert, over 12 three-minute rounds, but suffered weight-making trouble in the run-up to the fight. According to newspaper reports, Daly outboxed the champion and was leading on points when knocked out in the eighth round.

Retirement from boxing at age 17

By early 1930, Daly had moved into the lightweight division, and in March that year, in an article headed 'England's future champions', the Daily Express picked him as the country's most likely future world boxing champion.

On 20 April 1930, he fought future British featherweight champion and world-title challenger Seaman Tommy Watson, but again had weight-making difficulty in the run-up to the fight. Despite outboxing Watson for much of the contest, Daly was stopped in the 11th round, after being knocked down several times. He suffered concussion as a result of the fight and was unable to walk properly for several weeks. On 5 June 1930, he was hastily entered into a contest with Trealaw's Nobby Baker while still suffering from concussion and was stopped in the 13th round.

After a four-month break from boxing Daly tried to make a comeback. He had nine further contests: winning seven, losing one and drawing one. But the caliber of these opponents was far beneath the class of the men he had met previously, and press reports were unanimous in the assertion that his form had deteriorated markedly. It was widely held that, under his manager's direction, he had paid the price for having too many contests at too high a level, at too young an age. Realising, as he put it, that he would 'never be a world champion now' he decided to retire from boxing. He had his last fight on 27 January 1931 – exactly three weeks before his 18th birthday.

Nipper Pat Daly's boxing style

Daly was renowned for his hard, fast, accurate straight left (or jab), his quick, clever footwork, punching variety, ring intelligence and all-round boxing skill, coupled with a mastery of in-fighting as well as long-range boxing. He had an attacking style that entertained the crowds, but he tempered this with exceptional defensive skills. As a growing teenager predominantly fighting full-grown men he was not noted as a knockout puncher.

Later years

After retiring, Daly stayed involved with boxing and for much of his life served as a trainer during his spare time. In the late 1940s and early 1950s he ran a gym at New North Road in Shoreditch, from where he trained amateur boxers and also managed and trained a few professionals.

In the 1980s, he retired to Hastings, East Sussex, where he died on 25 September 1988.

Professional boxing record

Notes

References

External links
 Nipper Pat Daly website
 

1913 births
1988 deaths
Flyweight boxers
Bantamweight boxers
Featherweight boxers
Lightweight boxers
Welterweight boxers
English male boxers
Welsh male boxers